Couesmes-Vaucé is a commune in the Mayenne department in north-western France.

Couesmes-Vaucé is a small commune, with only 300 properties and as of the 2019 census 378 inhabitants.

Couesmes-Vaucé is close to both Normandy and Brittany and lies roughly 50 miles from the surrounding cities of Rennes, Caen and Le Mans. The village is situated in the heart of an agricultural region noted for its good food and cider.

There is a thriving and well integrated English community established over thirty years.

See also
 Communes of the Mayenne department

References

Couesmesvauce